Yesterday's Gone is the debut studio album by English duo Chad & Jeremy. It was released in the United States in July 1964. The album contains three of their American hits: "A Summer Song", "Willow Weep for Me", and the title song, "Yesterday's Gone." The song "The Truth Often Hurts the Heart" was prominently featured in a January 1965 episode of the television program The Patty Duke Show, but was never issued as a single.

Track listing
"A Summer Song" (Chad Stuart, Clive Metcalfe, Keith Noble) – 2:38
"Now and Forever" (Martin Dean) – 1:45
"Dirty Old Town" (Ewan MacColl) – 3:04
"Like I Love You Today" (Russell Alquist, Chad Stuart) – 2:38
"September in the Rain" (Harry Warren, Al Dubin) – 2:30
"Yesterday's Gone" (Chad Stuart, Wendy Kidd) – 2:29
"If She Was Mine" (Bobby Goldsboro, Buddy Buie) – 2:03
"Willow Weep for Me" (Ann Ronell)– 2:33
"Only for the Young" (instrumental) (Jimmy Seals) - 2:55
"Too Soon My Love" (Russell Alquist) – 2:28
"The Truth Often Hurts the Heart" (Clive Metcalfe, Keith Noble) - 2:49
"No Tears for Johnnie" (Tom Springfield) - 2:58

References

Chad & Jeremy albums
1964 debut albums